"Femme Like U (Donne-moi ton corps)" more commonly known as "Femme Like U" is a 2004 song recorded by Canadian artist Cyril Kamar, better known under the name of K.Maro. The song was released as the first single from his album La Good Life, on May 8, 2004. It achieved a huge success in many countries in Europe, including France, Belgium and Switzerland, where it topped their charts, being thus one of the summer hits. As of August 2014, the song was the 14th best-selling single of the 21st century in France, with 633,000 units sold.

This debut single is generally considered as K. Maro's signature song, although he has had other hits in Europe, such as "Crazy" or "Sous l'œil de l'ange", but which were less successful than "Femme Like U (Donne-moi ton corps)". The song is known under its short title, "Femme Like U", but the complete title is "Femme Like U (Donne-moi ton corps)", as it features in small letters on the single cover.

Although the lyrics are in French, they also contain several words in English throughout the song.

The female chorus is sung by Nancy Martinez.

Music video
In the music video, K. Maro meets a woman while he comes down from his car. Then they have dinner together during a reception, but K. Maro has an altercation with the woman's former boyfriend. These scenes alternate with those of K. Maro performing the song.

Awards
In 2005, "Femme Like U" won a NRJ Music Awards in the category 'Francophone song of the year'. The single sold more than 1,500,000 units in Europe, making it K. Maro's most successful song.

Track listings
 CD single
 "Femme Like U (Donne-moi ton corps)" (radio edit) — 3:50
 "Femme Like U (Donne-moi ton corps)" (just another hit remix) — 3:51

 CD maxi
 "Femme Like You (Donne-moi ton corps)" (radio edit) — 4:06
 "Femme Like You (Donne-moi ton corps)" (urban version) — 3:58
 "Femme Like You (Donne-moi ton corps)" (house version) — 6:39
 "La Good Life" — 3:57

 12" maxi
 "Femme Like U (Donne-moi ton corps)" (radio edit) — 3:58
 "Femme Like U (Donne-moi ton corps)" (urban version) — 3:58
 "Femme Like U (Donne-moi ton corps)" (house version) — 6:39

Charts and sales

Peak positions

End of year charts

Decade-end charts

Certifications

Covers
The Canadian singer-songwriter Cœur de pirate released her own version in 2019. Her version was within the context of the "Back dans les Bacs!" (#BACKDANSLESBACS) project, a musical programme in which more recent upcoming and successful artists would pay tribute to earlier songs that they actually like from earlier artists.

References

External links
 "Femme Like U (Donne-moi ton corps)", lyrics
 "Femme Like U (Donne-moi ton corps)", music video

2004 debut singles
K.Maro songs
Ultratop 50 Singles (Flanders) number-one singles
Ultratop 50 Singles (Wallonia) number-one singles
SNEP Top Singles number-one singles
Number-one singles in Switzerland
Macaronic songs
Franglais songs
2004 songs
East West Records singles